Freeway Madness is the sixth album by the English rock band Pretty Things. It was released in late 1972 on Warner Bros. Records and reissued by Warner Bros. imprint The Medicine Label in 1995 with additional liner notes from Phil May..

It's the second album without founding member Dick Taylor and the first without bassist Wally Waller as a full member, who had been with the band since the band's 1967 album Emotions. However, he did produce the album, as well as sing vocals on one of the tracks. Since he worked as a producer for EMI at the time, he appears on this album under the alias "Asa Jones".

Track listing

Charts

Personnel

Pretty Things
Phil May – lead vocals
Pete Tolson – guitar
Jon Povey – keyboards, vocals
Stuart Brooks – bass guitar
Skip Alan – drums

Additional musicians
Gordon Huntley – pedal steel guitar on "Country Road"
Wally Waller – vocals on "Over the Moon"
Don Harper – viola
Billy Reid – violin
Johnny Van Derrick – violin
Peter Willison – cello

References

1972 albums
Pretty Things albums
Warner Records albums
Albums with cover art by Hipgnosis
Albums recorded at Morgan Sound Studios